SS New York was a German passenger liner launched in 1926 for the Hamburg-America Line and was the sister to the , , and . During World War II the ship continued its passenger service until in 1940, the Kriegsmarine requisitioned it as a accommodation ship for the war. The ship was sunk in an air raid at Kiel in 1945.

History

Background and construction
The ship would be laid down by the Blohm & Voss shipyard as yard No 474 and was launched on October 20, 1926, as the SS New York

Ocean liner service
On April 1, 1927, the ship undertook her maiden voyage on the  Hamburg to New York route. On January 31, 1928, she was the first Albert Ballin-class ship to take a cruise from New York via Madeira to the Mediterranean Sea and on to Istanbul, before ending on April 1 in Hamburg. On December 18 and 19, 1934 she assisted during the distress of the small Norwegian steamer Sisto at approx. 50N 22W, which had become unable to maneuver in a hurricane during a journey from Canada to Europe. The New York took the rescued crew to Southampton.

New York continued in liner service until 1940.

World War 2 service and fate
During World War 2 the ship was stationed at Kiel and was requisitioned for use as a accommodation ship to train sailors and other military personnel.

References

1926 ships
Ships built in Hamburg
Kriegsmarine
Ships of the Hamburg America Line